WKXK (96.7 FM, "The Big KD") is a radio station licensed to serve Pine Hill, Alabama, United States.  The station is owned by Autaugaville Radio, Inc.

It broadcasts an urban adult contemporary music format as a simulcast of sister station WKXN.

History
This station received its original construction permit from the Federal Communications Commission on April 30, 1996.  The new station was assigned the call letters WKXK by the FCC on April 1, 1998.  WKXK received its license to cover from the FCC on January 8, 2001.

References

External links

The Big Station - DJs and Nosey Neighbors in Montgomery, Alabama (website for film about WKXN/WKXK)

KXK
Urban adult contemporary radio stations in the United States
Radio stations established in 2001
2001 establishments in Alabama
Wilcox County, Alabama